Fulvoclysia rjabovi is a species of moth of the family Tortricidae. It is found in Armenia and Iran.

References

Moths described in 1976
Cochylini